The Memorial to Heroic Self-Sacrifice is a public monument in Postman's Park in the City of London, commemorating ordinary people who died saving the lives of others and who might otherwise have been forgotten. It was first proposed by painter and sculptor George Frederic Watts in 1887, to commemorate the Golden Jubilee of Queen Victoria. The scheme was not accepted at that time, and in 1898 Watts was approached by Henry Gamble, vicar of St Botolph's Aldersgate church. Postman's Park was built on the church's former churchyard, and the church was at that time trying to raise funds to secure its future; Gamble felt that Watts's proposed memorial would raise the profile of the park. The memorial was unveiled in an unfinished state in 1900, consisting of a  wooden loggia designed by Ernest George, sheltering a wall with space for 120 ceramic memorial tiles to be designed and made by William De Morgan. At the time of opening, only four of the memorial tiles were in place. Watts died in 1904, and his widow Mary Watts took over the running of the project.

In 1906, after making 24 memorial tablets for the project, William De Morgan abandoned the ceramics business to become a novelist, and the only ceramics firm able to manufacture appropriate further tiles was Royal Doulton. Dissatisfied with Royal Doulton's designs, and preoccupied with the management of the Watts Gallery and Watts Mortuary Chapel in Compton, Surrey, Mary Watts lost interest in the project. Work to complete it was sporadic and ceased altogether in 1931 with only 53 of the planned 120 tiles in place. In 2009, the Diocese of London consented to further additions to the memorial, and the first new tablet in 78 years was added.

The Everyday Heroes of Postman’s Park, a now discontinued mobile app, was published in 2013. It provided a detailed account of the fifty-four incidents commemorated on the Memorial when a visitor scanned its plaque with a handheld device.

Tablets

The tablets are arranged in three rows, with 24 tablets to De Morgan's original design in the third, central, row, the 24 tablets added in 1908 directly below in the fourth row, and more recent additions above the original tiles in the second row. The first and fifth of the five rows remain empty.

The first four tablets, designed and manufactured by De Morgan and installed in 1900, were each made from two large custom-made tiles. Nine further De Morgan tablets, installed in 1902, were made using standard tiles to reduce costs, and were the last tiles whose installation was overseen by Watts. Eleven more De Morgan tablets, along with T. H. Wren's memorial to Watts, were added in 1905, completing the central row of tablets.

All 24 tablets of the fourth row, designed and manufactured by Royal Doulton, were added as a single batch in August 1908. A single Royal Doulton tablet to PC Alfred Smith was added in June 1919, followed in October 1930 by similar Royal Doulton tablets to three further police officers, and a replacement tablet with the correct details of the East Ham Sewage Works incident of 1895. A single tablet made by Fred Passenger in the original De Morgan style, honouring schoolboy Herbert Maconoghu, was added in April 1931 to fill the gap in the centre row left by the removal of the original, incorrect tablet to the victims of the East Ham Sewage Works incident. In 2009 a 54th tablet was added, in the style of the Royal Doulton tiles, to commemorate print technician Leigh Pitt, the first addition to the wall for 78 years.

In other media 
Monument (1980-81), a multimedia installation by the artist Susan Hiller, consists of enlarged photographic replicas of 41 tablets arranged into a new formation, and points towards the neglect and overlooked status of the Memorial at the time. Viewers are invited to sit on a park bench with their back to the photographs and listen on headphones to a soundtrack of the artist speaking on notions of death, memory and heroism. The soundtrack also includes a litany of the commemorated names, noting the time each spent ‘in the body’ versus time ‘as a representation’. Monument is considered a key work of British conceptual art of the period, and has been part of Tate’s collection since 1994. 

The tiles dedicated to Alice Ayres became a plot point in the 2004 film, Closer.

Notes
 Although the memorial had been designed with space for 120 tablets, the Watts Gallery had been hostile to plans to complete it beyond the 53 tablets existing at the time of Mary Watts's death, considering the monument in its unfinished state to be a symbol of the Watts's values and beliefs, and that its status as a historic record of its time is what made it of value.

 The last tablet made using custom tiles; subsequent tablets used standard  tiles to reduce costs.

 The original William De Morgan tile installed in 1902 incorrectly gave the location as West Ham rather than East Ham, and the date as 1885 instead of 1895. On 15 October 1930, the tablet was removed, and replaced by a tablet made by Royal Doulton that displayed the correct information. As the Royal Doulton tablets were in a different style to those of William De Morgan, the replacement tablet was installed in the second row alongside other Royal Doulton tiles.

 Rabbeth was a doctor at the Royal Free Hospital, treating a four-year-old diphtheria patient. The child was suffering an obstruction to the throat, which doctors were unable to clear, and Rabbeth put his own lips to the tracheotomy tube and sucked the obstruction free despite knowing that he would himself contract the disease as a result. Both Rabbeth and the child died.

 The case of Alice Ayres was the example cited by Watts when he first publicly proposed a memorial to ordinary heroes. The memorial tablet to Alice Ayres forms a key plot element in the 2004 film Closer.

 The last of the tablets to be added in George Frederic Watts's lifetime

 The last tablet designed by William De Morgan, who in 1906 gave up the ceramic business to become a novelist

 Commissioned by Mary Watts and Henry Gamble, vicar of St Botolph's Aldersgate. Designed by T. H. Wren, a student of the school of arts and crafts established by Watts in Compton, Surrey. The plaque is situated on a central column, in the third row between the tablets to Alexander Stewart Brown and Richard Farris.

 The last tablet to be added from the list of names proposed by George Frederic Watts before his death

 Commissioned by Mary Watts from Fred Passenger, a former employee of De Morgan who had set up his own ceramics business using De Morgan designs, to fill the gap in the third row left by the removal of the original tablet to the victims of the East Ham Sewage Works accident. The last memorial to be installed in Mary Watts's lifetime. The exact date of installation is unknown.

 Leigh Pitt, a print technician from Surrey, had died on 7 June 2007 rescuing nine-year-old Harley Bagnall-Taylor, who was drowning in a canal in Thamesmead. His colleague Jane Shaka approached the Diocese of London to suggest that Pitt would make a suitable addition to the memorial, and despite previous opposition from the Watts Gallery to proposals to complete the memorial, on 11 June 2009 this tablet was added to the Memorial to Heroic Self-Sacrifice, the first new tablet added to the memorial since that of Herbert Maconoghu 78 years earlier.

References
Citations

Bibliography

External links

 The Everyday Heroes of Postman’s Park mobile app

Grade II* listed buildings in the City of London
London-related lists
Monuments and memorials in London